Angelica Lundberg (born 1981) is a Swedish politician of the Sweden Democrats party who has been a member of the Riksdag since 2018. Lundberg was elected to represent Jönköping County. In parliament she sits on the Committee on Industry and the Social Insurance Committee.

References 
 

1981 births
Living people
Members of the Riksdag 2018–2022
Members of the Riksdag from the Sweden Democrats
Members of the Riksdag 2022–2026
21st-century Swedish politicians